Gert Tony Hubert Verhulst (born 24 January 1968 in Berchem) is a Belgian presenter, entrepreneur, singer, autodidact, director, actor, screenwriter, composer, film producer, millionaire & business magnate. As a prominent figure within the children's entertainment industry in the Benelux, he is regarded as a Flemish cultural icon, known for his influence and contributions to children's entertainment in the Benelux and founder of Studio 100.

Life and career

Verhulst already knew on a very early age that he wanted to become famous (own words). In 1987 he applied at the Royal Conservatoire Antwerp  where he was rejected, he would recall this as a gift from Heaven. Later that year he got his first job at the former BRTN (now VRT) as continuity announcer.

Samson en Gert 
Samson & Gert is a Flemish children's television series produced by Eline van Noppen, centered on the talking dog Samson and his owner Gert. In its entire run, the show was originally aired on TV1 from Christmas Day 1989 until 1 December 1997, where it moved to Ketnet and continues airing all of its episodes to this day. As a continuity announcer Verhulst wanted to make the announcements before children's television programmes more appealing by having an animal puppet next to him. He got in touch with puppeteer Danny Verbiest, who created the puppet dog Samson. Samson, an Old English Sheepdog, made his screen debut on 2 September 1989. The pair's popularity grew very rapidly in Flanders and they were given their own television series in 1990. The show, named Samson, premiered on 2 September 1990. During the show, Samson and Gert and their friends would encounter many funny and chaotic situations. The plot would be interrupted for contests, fan mail and a variety of cartoons, such as The Smurfs, Ovide and the Gang, and Mrs. Pepper Pot.

Zeg eens Euh! 
Verhulst presented the language game  (translated: Say Uh!) It was a game that was broadcast on Friday between 1992 and 1997 and whose concept was clearly inspired by the British radio game, Just a Minute. The panelists alternately were given a theme that they had to talk about for one minute. Together with the theme they got a banned word that they could not use. During the summer months, the viewer share rose from 700,000 to 800,000 viewers. When Verhulst moved to Vtm,  took over the game but after a scandal involving one of the panel members, Emiel Goelen, the show was dismissed.

Move to VTM 
In 1997 Verhulst moved to Vtm where he presented Wat zegt u? (translated: What do you say ?). This was followed by Linx and in the summer of 1998 Verhulst presented Sterrenslag (translated: Star battle) for several weeks because presenter 'Herbert Bruynseels' had had to withdraw due to illness. In the summer of 1999, the dialect game Watte?

Studio 100 

They came together in 1989, when the programme Samson en Gert (translated Samson and Gert) was first produced. Studio 100 started in 1996 with one program Samson en Gert. They immediately decided to create a new program to be able to advertise themselves more. They chose Kabouter Plop (translated Gnome Plop). It has been broadcast on VTM since 1997. In 1999, Studio 100 expanded significantly with four new projects, all launched in Flanders: a musical, a film, and two new television programmes. For both the musical and the film, Vtm was asked to provide financial support. In October of '99, Studio 100 and the VMMa (Vlaamse Media Maatschappij, founded in 1987 as Vlaamse Televisie Maatschappij by nine publishers each with an 11.1% share), announced that they would incorporate Meli Park. Studio 100 has access to the largest recording studios in all of Belgium. Frequently, big events are hosted there, such as the preselections for the Eurovision Song Contest. The Dutch department of Studio 100 resides in the Mediapark in Hilversum. and Animation studio's in Paris, Sydney & Munich, 2 TV stations. Studio 100 bought Flying Bark Productions, so they could create Master Raindrop and is continuously doing business with more than 160 broadcasters on average, operate on a regular base in 110 territories worldwide through selling TV, Video On Demand and Home Video Licenses. For example, Maya the Bee has been sold to broadcasters covering even more than 150 countries

Personal life 

In 1998 he married Valerie Calliau with whom he had a son (Victor Verhulst, 1993) and a daughter , 1995), before splitting up in 2003. His daughter, Marie Verhulst, is also an actress. At the time of the musical"Sleeping Beauty there were rumours that Verhulst was having a relationship with Karen Damen from the popular girl group, K3. Verhulst always denied the relationship, but in February 2005, pictures of the couple appeared in a Dutch newspaper. In April the couple broke up, after a relationship of four years. From 2008 to 2011, Verhulst had a relationship with Ellen Callebout, a restaurant owner from Blankenberge. In 2012 Verhulst had a very short relationship with Josje Huisman, also a singer from  K3, but after a few months they split up. Since then, he has gotten back together with Callebout and the couple married in 2019.

Trivia
In 1999 Verhulst bought an institution for poor children "Villa Zonnelicht" in Kapellen, Belgium (translated: villa sunlight) for BF7.100.000 or €176,000 and made it his Private home.
In 2007 he won together with  the second season of "Best friends" at Eén.
Verhulst was along with Hans Bourlon, elected Manager of the Year by the Belgian weekly Magazine Trends in 2008.
In 2009 Gert Verhulst bought a Motor Yacht from 36-meter with 8 suites called Evanna.
In 2013 Verhulst announced that Studio 100 had made a USD 50.000 (EUR 38.868) offer at the auction site of the American Federal Agency to buy a disused Air Force One. The plane would have carried six US presidents between 1975 and 2005.
In 2014 he participated in TV Show/contest  (translated: The Smartest Person in the World), after the invitation of presenter Erik Van Looy. where he was the first time in twelve seasons that survived the eleventh participation. and finished third.
He stood at the cradle of musicals like Snow White, Cinderella, Robin Hood and Sleeping Beauty.
In 2017, together with his business partner Hans Bourlon, he was awarded the Prize for Liberty by the Flemish classical-liberal think tank Libera!.

Discography

Albums 
"Samson & Gert 1" 1991
"Samson & Gert 2" 1992
"Samson & Gert 3" 1993
"Samson & Gert 4" 1995
"Samson & Gert 5" 1995
"Samson & Gert 6" 1996
"Samson & Gert 7" 1997
"Samson & Gert 8" 1998
"Samson & Gert 9" 1999
"Samson & Gert 10 – Het beste uit 10 jaar Samson en Gert" 2000
"Samson & Gert 11 – De wereld is mooi" 2001
"Samson & Gert 12 – Oh la la la" 2002
"Samson & Gert 13 – Jiepie ja hee" 2003
"Hotel op stelten" 2008
"20 jaar Samson & Gert" 2010

Singles 
"Samsonrock" (Samson & Gert) 1991
"Verliefd zijn" (Samson & Gert) 1991
"Wij gaan naar de maan" (Samson & Gert) 1992
"10 Miljoen" (Samson & Gert) 1992
"Samen delen" (Samson & Gert) 1992
"Samen op de moto" (Samson & Gert) 1992
"Wij komen naar jou" (Samson & Gert) 1992
"De snijdersbank" (Samson & Gert) 1992
"De bel doet 't niet" (Samson & Gert) 1993
"Repeteren" (Samson & Gert) 1993
"Piraten-Potpourri" (Samson & Gert) 1993
"Samson toch!" (Samson & Gert) 1994
"Wat ben ik blij" (Samson & Gert) 1994
"Wij zijn bij de brandweer" (Samson & Gert) 1994
"Als je heel erg veel verliefd bent" 1994 (Samson & Gert)
"Bij Heidi in Tirol" (Samson & Gert) 1995
"In de disco" (Samson & Gert) 1995
"Druk" (Samson & Gert) 1995
"Wereldberoemd" (Samson & Gert) 1995
"Wie gaat er mee?" (Samson & Gert) 1996
"Aap in Huis" (Samson & Gert) 1996
"De mooiste dag" (Samson & Gert) 1996
"Wij weten wat liefde is" (Samson & Gert) 1996
"Het spook van de opera" (Samson & Gert) 1997
"Jimmy de cowboy" (Samson & Gert) 1997
"Mannetjes van Mars" (Samson & Gert) 1998
"Wakker worden" (Samson & Gert) 1998
"Wij willen voetballen" (Samson & Gert) 1998
"Roeien" (Samson & Gert) 1998
"S.O.S." (Samson & Gert) 1998
"Piloot" (Samson & Gert) 1999
"Storm op zee" (Samson & Gert) 1999
"Bim bam bom" (Samson & Gert) 2000
"De mooiste dromen" (Samson & Gert) 2000
"Vooruit" (Samson & Gert) 2000
"Yeah yeah yeah" (Samson & Gert) 2001
"De wereld is mooi!" (Samson & Gert) 2001
"We zijn op elkaar" (Samson & Gert) 2001
"Oh la la la!" (Samson & Gert en de 6 Teens) 2002 
"Olé pistolé" (Samson & Gert en de 6 Teens) 2002
"Radio" (Samson & Gert) 2003
"Lieve Samson" (Samson & Gert) 2006
"Naar zee" (Samson & Gert) 2007
"Heet" (Samson & Gert) 2008
"Vrede op aarde" (Samson & Gert) 2008
"Vrienden voor het leven" (Samson & Gert) 2008
"Vrolijk liedje" (Samson & Gert) 2008
"Ik ben verliefd" (Samson & Gert) 2008
"Alles is op" (Samson & Gert) 2008
"Oh lalala" (Samson & Gert) 2008
"Sinterklaas en Zwarte Piet" (Samson & Gert) 2009
"Springen in de zee" (Samson & Gert) 2009
"Kerstmis Kerstmis" (Samson & Gert) 2013
"Wij gaan vliegen" (Samson & Gert) 2013
"Tingelingeling" (Samson & Gert) 2014
"Zwaaien" (Samson & Gert) 2014
"Hiep hiep hiep hoera!" (Samson & Gert) 2015

Filmography

Filmography (Producer)

Filmography (Director)

All Credits here :*

See also

References

External links
 Gert Verhulst at Studio 100 Website
 

Belgian film producers
1968 births
Living people
Belgian cinematographers
Belgian screenwriters
Belgian film directors
Belgian chief executives
People from Berchem
Entertainers from Antwerp
Belgian company founders
Belgian singer-songwriters
20th-century Belgian male singers
20th-century Belgian singers
20th-century Belgian male actors
Dutch-language singers of Belgium
Male composers
Musicians from Antwerp
Belgian pop singers
21st-century Belgian male singers
21st-century Belgian singers
Royal Warrant holders
Belgian male film actors
20th-century Belgian businesspeople
21st-century Belgian businesspeople
Businesspeople from Antwerp
Belgian television presenters
Flemish television presenters
Belgian television talk show hosts